Following is a list of justices of the Supreme Court of Mississippi.

These justices served in three different iterations of the court.

Supreme judges of the State of Mississippi (1818–1832)

Judges of the High Court of Errors and Appeals of Mississippi (1832–1870)

Justices of the Supreme Court of Mississippi (1870–Present)

References

Mississippi state court judges
Justices
Mississippi